This is the list of Masterpiece Mystery! episodes in order by season.

Episodes

In early 2008, Masterpiece Theatre and its affiliated program Mystery! were reformatted as Masterpiece.  Masterpiece is aired as three different series.  Initially, Masterpiece Classic aired in the winter and early spring, Masterpiece Mystery! in the late spring and summer, and Masterpiece Contemporary in the fall.  In later seasons, particularly after an increase in funding for WGBH and Masterpiece, the scheduling became more random.  Currently, all three programs air at any time throughout the year, and on nearly half the Sundays, two episodes from two different miniseries will air on the same night.

This lists the titles of the individual miniseries.  Some ran for only one episode, many ran for two or more installments.  The following lists them according to original season, and then in alphabetical order.  Also included are the original UK series and episode numbers for each program, when they differ from the US numbers.  The number of the season continues in the sequence set by the predecessor series, Masterpiece Theatre, which ended with Season 37.  This is in spite of the fact that the other predecessor series, Mystery!, ended with Season 27.  All episodes that air in one calendar year are considered to be in the same season.

For lists of episodes of the other two series, see List of Masterpiece Classic episodes, and List of Masterpiece Contemporary episodes.  For older episodes of Mystery!, see List of Mystery episodes.

This list does not include any rebroadcasts of series, including those previously shown on Masterpiece Theatre or Mystery!

Season 38 (2008)
Foyle's War, Series V (July 13, 20 and 27) 
Inspector Lewis, Series I (June 22, 29 and July 6)
The Inspector Lynley Mysteries, Series VII (UK Series VI) (Aug 10 and 17)
The Sally Lockhart Mysteries: The Shadow in the North (Sept 28)

Season 39 (2009)

Inspector Lewis, Series II (UK Series II: 1-4 and Series III: 1-3)  (Aug 30, Sept 6, 13, 20, Oct 4, 11, and 18)
Six By Agatha
Agatha Christie's Marple, Series IV  (July 5, 12, 19 and 26).
Agatha Christie's Poirot, Series IX (UK Series XI: 1-2)  (June 21 and 28).
Wallander, Series I  (May 10, 17 and 31).

Season 40 (2010)

David Suchet on the Orient Express - A Masterpiece Special (Wed, July 7)
Foyle's War, Series VI (May 2, 9 and 16)
Inspector Lewis, Series III (UK Series III: 4 and Series IV: 1-4)  (Aug 29, Sept 5, 12, 19, and 26)
Sherlock, Series I (Oct 24, 31 and Nov 7)
Six By Agatha
Agatha Christie's Marple, Series V (UK Series V: 2-4)  (May 23, June 20 and 27).
Agatha Christie's Poirot, Series X (UK Series XII: 3 & Series XI: 3-4) (July 11, 18 and 25)
Wallander, Series II (Oct 3, 10 and 17)

Season 41 (2011)

Agatha Christie Mysteries
Agatha Christie's Marple, Series VI (UK Series V: 1) (July 10)
Agatha Christie's Poirot, Series XI (UK Series XII: 1,2,4) (June 19, 26 and July 3)
Case Histories, Series I (Oct 16, 23 and 30)
Inspector Lewis, Series IV (UK Series V) (Sept 4, 18, 25 and Oct 9)
Zen, Series I (July 17, 24 and 31)

Season 42 (2012)
Endeavour (UK Pilot) (July 1)
Inspector Lewis, Series V (UK Series VI) (July 8, 15, 22, and 29)
Sherlock, Series II (May 6, 13, and 20)
Wallander, Series III (Sept 9, 16, and 23)

Season 43 (2013)
Endeavour, Series I (July 7, 14, 21, and 28)
Foyle's War, Series VII (Sept 15, 22, and 29)
The Lady Vanishes (Aug 18)
Inspector Lewis, Series VI (UK Series VII) (June 16, 23, and 30)
Silk, Series I (Aug 25, Sept 1, and 8)

Season 44 (2014)
Agatha Christie's Marple, Series VII (UK Series VI) (Sept 21, and 28)
Agatha Christie's Poirot, Series XII (UK Series XIII: 2-3) (July 27 and Aug 3)
Breathless (Aug 24, 31, and Sept 7)
Death Comes to Pemberley (Oct 26 and Nov 2)
Endeavour, Series II (June 29, July 6, 13, and 20)
The Escape Artist (June 15 and 22)
Inspector Lewis, Series VII (UK Series VIII) (Oct 5, 12, and 19)
Sherlock, Series III (Jan 19, 26, and Feb 2)

Season 45 (2015)
Arthur & George (Sept 6, 13, and 20)
Grantchester, Series I (Jan 18 and 25, Feb 1, 8, 15, and 22)

Season 46 (2016)
Endeavour, Series III (June 19 and 26, July 3 and 10)
Grantchester, Series II (March 27, Apr 3, 10, 17, 24, and May 1)
Inspector Lewis, Series VIII (UK Series IX) (Aug 7, 14, and 21)
Sherlock: The Abominable Bride (Special Episode) (Jan 1)
Wallander, The Final Season (UK Series IV) (May 8, 15, and 22)

Season 47 (2017)
Dark Angel (May 21)
Endeavour, Series IV (Aug 20 and 27, Sept 3 and 10)
Grantchester, Series III (June 18 and 25, July 2, 9, 16, 23, and 30)
My Mother and Other Strangers (June 18 and 25, July 2, 9, and 16)
Prime Suspect: Tennison (June 25, July 2 and 9)
Sherlock, Series IV (Jan 1, 8, and 15)

Season 48 (2018)
Endeavour, Series V (June 24, July 1, 8, 15, 22, and 29)
Unforgotten, Series I and II (Apr 8, 15, 22, and 29, May 6 and 13)

Season 49 (2019)
Endeavour, Series VI (June 16, 23, and 30, July 7)
Grantchester, Series IV (July 14, 21, and 28, Aug 4 and 11)
Unforgotten, Series III (Apr 7, 14, 21, and 28, May 5 and 12)

Season 50 (2020)
Baptiste, Series I (Apr 12, 19, and 26, May 3, 10, and 17)
Endeavour, Series VII (Aug 9, 16, and 23)
Flesh and Blood (Oct 4, 11, 18, and 25)
Grantchester, Series V (June 14, 21, and 28, July 5, 12, and 19)
Roadkill (Nov 1, 8, 15, and 22)
Van der Valk, Series I (Sep 13, 20, and 27)

Season 51 (2021)
Baptiste, Series II (Oct 17, 24, and 31, Nov 7, 14, and 21)
Grantchester, Series VI (Oct 3, 10, 17, 24, and 31, Nov 7, 14, and 21)
Guilt, Series I (Sept 5 and 12)
Miss Scarlet and The Duke, Series I (Jan 17, 24, and 31, Feb 7, 14, and 21)
Unforgotten, Series IV (July 11, 18, and 25, Aug 1, 8, and 15)

Season 52 (2022)
Annika (Oct 16, 23, and 30, Nov 6, 13, and 20)
Endeavour, Series VIII (June 19 and 26, July 3)
Grantchester, Series VII (July 10, 17, 24, and 31, Aug 7 and 14)
Guilt, Series II (Aug 28, Sept 4 and 11)
Magpie Murders (Oct 16, 23, and 30, Nov 6, 13, and 20)
Miss Scarlet and The Duke, Series II (Oct 16, 23, and 30, Nov 6, 13, and 20)
Van der Valk, series II (Sep 25, Oct 2 and 9)

Season 53 (2023)
Miss Scarlet and The Duke, Series III (Jan 8, 15, 22, and 29, Feb 5 and 12)

References

External links
Official website

Lists of American drama television series episodes